Sirus Alvand (Persian: سیروس الوند; born January 31, 1951), also spelled Cyrous Alvand, is an Iranian director and screenwriter who was born in 1951 in Tehran, Iran. He began his career as film critic and screenwriter and directed his debut film Sanjar in 1971. He is among filmmakers of pre-Revolution era who are still working. Some of his films were among box office hits. 

In 1993, he won a Crystal Simorgh for best director in the 11th Fajr International Film Festival.

Films 
 Outcry under the Water, 1977
 Stemming from Blood, 1983
 Cargo, 1987
 Once and for All, 1992
 The Face, 1995
 The Corrupted Hands, 1999
 The Intruder, 2001
 Porteghal Khoni, 2010

References

External links
 

1951 births
Crystal Simorgh for Best Director winners
Living people
Iranian film directors